Guy Krohg (27 July 1917 – 19 October 2002) was a Norwegian painter, illustrator and scenographer. He was born in Kristiania, the son of painter Per Krohg and grandson of Christian Krohg and Oda Krohg. He was married to Lilian Smith from 1940, and to actress Sossen Krohg from 1949. He is represented at the National Gallery with Vintersol from 1954 and other works. He worked for a number of theatres, including Oslo Nye Teater, Studioteatret, Det Norske Teatret and Nationaltheatret. In 1995 he published a biography of his father.

References

1917 births
2002 deaths
Artists from Oslo
20th-century Norwegian painters
Norwegian male painters
Norwegian illustrators
Norwegian biographers
Male biographers
20th-century biographers
20th-century Norwegian male writers
20th-century Norwegian male artists